Sione Kalamafoni (born 18 May 1988) is a rugby union footballer who plays at number 8 for Scarlets. Kalamafoni played for Tonga at the 2011 Rugby World Cup, 2015 Rugby World Cup and the 2019 Rugby World Cup.

Career
Kalamafoni first signed to Nottingham in the RFU Championship from the 2010/11 season. 
On 15 March 2012, Kalamafoni would leave Nottingham to sign for Gloucester Rugby in the Aviva Premiership on a two-year contract from 2012/13 season. On 14 November 2013, Kalamafoni signed a two-year contract extension with Gloucester until the end of 2015/16 season.

On 1 June 2017 Leicester Tigers announced that Kalamafoni would be joining them for the 2017-18 season.

On 26 March 2020, it was confirmed that Kalamafoni would sign for Welsh region Scarlets in the Pro14 ahead of the 2020-21 season.

Personal life
Kalamafoni is a Mormon and undertook a two-year mission in Chicago at the age of 18.  In January 2021 he and his family became British citizens.

References

External links

2011 Rugby World Cup Profile
Gloucester Rugby profile

1988 births
Living people
Tongan rugby union players
Tonga international rugby union players
Gloucester Rugby players
Nottingham R.F.C. players
Rugby union flankers
Rugby union number eights
Tongan expatriate rugby union players
Expatriate rugby union players in England
Tongan expatriate sportspeople in England
Leicester Tigers players
Scarlets players